V. album may refer to:
 Veratrum album, the false helleborine, a medicinal plant species native to Europe
 Viscum album, the European mistletoe or common mistletoe, a plant species native to Europe and western and southern Asia

See also
 Album (disambiguation)